Nicolás Mazzola (born 28 January 1990) is an Argentine professional footballer who plays as a forward for Instituto.

References

External links

tuttomercatoweb.com

1991 births
Living people
Argentine footballers
Argentine expatriate footballers
Argentine people of Italian descent
Club Atlético Independiente footballers
FC Locarno players
Instituto footballers
Club de Gimnasia y Esgrima La Plata footballers
O'Higgins F.C. footballers
Panetolikos F.C. players
Unión de Santa Fe footballers
Arsenal de Sarandí footballers
Argentine Primera División players
Primera Nacional players
Chilean Primera División players
Super League Greece players
Argentine expatriate sportspeople in Switzerland
Argentine expatriate sportspeople in Chile
Argentine expatriate sportspeople in Greece
Expatriate footballers in Switzerland
Expatriate footballers in Chile
Expatriate footballers in Greece
Association football midfielders